Apart from his orchestral keyboard concertos and his solo organ concertos, Johann Sebastian Bach composed keyboard concertos for unaccompanied harpsichord:
 Most of his Weimar concerto transcriptions, over twenty arrangements of Italian and Italianate orchestral concertos which he produced around 1713–1714 when he was employed in Weimar, were written for solo harpsichord (BWV 592a and 972–987).
 Two decades later, some ten years after he had become  in Leipzig, he wrote a concerto for two harpsichords, BWV 1061a, which was later orchestrated as BWV 1061.
 The Italian Concerto, BWV 971, was published in 1735 as part of his Clavier-Übung II.

Weimar concerto transcriptions

In his Weimar period, Johann Sebastian Bach transcribed Italian and Italianate concertos. Most, if not all, of the concerto transcriptions for unaccompanied harpsichord were realised from July 1713 to July 1714. Most of these transcriptions were based on concertos by Antonio Vivaldi. Other models for the transcriptions included concertos by Alessandro Marcello, Benedetto Marcello, Georg Philipp Telemann and Prince Johann Ernst of Saxe-Weimar.

Concerto in G major, BWV 592a

After  by Prince Johann Ernst of Saxe-Weimar, and organ version BWV 592.

Movements:
 [no tempo indication]
 Grave
 Presto

Concerto in D major, BWV 972

After Violin Concerto in D major Op. 3 No. 9 (RV 230) by Antonio Vivaldi. There is an earlier version of this arrangement, BWV 972a.

Movements:
 [no tempo indication]
 Largo- Larghetto
 Allegro

Concerto in G major, BWV 973

After Violin Concerto in G major, RV 299, by Antonio Vivaldi (later version published as Op. 7 No. 8).

Movements:
 [no tempo indication]
 Largo
 Allegro

Concerto in D minor, BWV 974

After Oboe Concerto in D minor by Alessandro Marcello.

Movements:
 [no tempo indication]
 Adagio
 Presto

Concerto in G minor, BWV 975

After Violin Concerto in G minor, RV 316, by Antonio Vivaldi (variant RV 316a, published as Op. 4 No. 6).

Movements:
 [no tempo indication]
 Largo
 Giga Presto

Concerto in C major, BWV 976

After Violin Concerto in E major Op. 3 No. 12 (RV 265) by Antonio Vivaldi.

Movements:
 [no tempo indication]
 Largo
 Allegro

Concerto in C major, BWV 977
After an unidentified model.

Movements:
 [no tempo indication]
 Adagio
 Giga

Concerto in F major, BWV 978

After Violin Concerto in G major Op. 3 No. 3 (RV 310) by Antonio Vivaldi.

Movements:
 Allegro
 Largo
 Allegro

Concerto in B minor, BWV 979
After Violin Concerto in D minor, RV 813, by Antonio Vivaldi (formerly RV Anh. 10 attributed to Torelli).

Movements:
 Allegro – Adagio
 Allegro
 Andante
 Adagio
 Allegro

Concerto in G major, BWV 980

After Violin Concerto in B-flat major, RV 383 by Antonio Vivaldi (variant RV 383a published as Op. 4 No. 1).

Movements:
 [no tempo indication]
 Largo
 Allegro

Concerto in C minor, BWV 981
After Violin Concerto in C minor Op. 1 No. 2 by Benedetto Marcello.

Movements:
 Adagio
 Vivace
 [no tempo indication]
 Prestissimo

Concerto in B-flat major, BWV 982

After Violin Concerto in B-flat major Op. 1 No. 1 by Prince Johann Ernst of Saxe-Weimar.

Movements:
 [no tempo indication]
 Adagio
 Allegro
 Allegro

Concerto in G minor, BWV 983
After an unidentified model.

Movements:
 [no tempo indication]
 Adagio
 Allegro

Concerto in C major, BWV 984

After the Violin Concerto in C major by Prince Johann Ernst of Saxe–Weimar (like BWV 595).

Movements:
 [no tempo indication]
 Adagio e affettoso
 Allegro assai

Concerto in G minor, BWV 985

Movements:
 [no tempo indication]
 Adagio
 Allegro

Concerto in G major, BWV 986
After an unidentified model.

Movements:
 [no tempo indication]
 Adagio
 Allegro

Concerto in D minor, BWV 987

After Concerto Op. 1 No. 4 by Prince Johann Ernst of Saxe-Weimar.

Movements:
 [no tempo indication]
 Allegro
 Adagio
 Vivace

Original compositions
Bach composed unaccompanied keyboard concertos for one and two harpsichords.

Italian Concerto included in Clavier-Übung II

Bach's Italian Concerto, BWV 971, was published in 1735, as first of two compositions included in Clavier-Übung II. An early version of the concerto's first movement survives in an 18th-century copy.

Early version of Concerto for two harpsichords, BWV 1061

BWV 1061a, a concerto for two harpsichords without accompaniment, is Bach's original version of the Concerto for two harpsichords and strings, BWV 1061.

Doubtful works
Several concertos for unaccompanied harpsichord are listed as doubtful in Anhang II of the 1998 edition of the Bach-Werke-Verzeichnis: 
 BWV 909 – Concerto and Fugue in C minor
 BWV Anh. 151 – Concerto in C major
 BWV Anh. 152 – Concerto in G major

Discography

BWV 592a and 972–987
  (1999). Brilliant Classics 99372/3 and /4.

Italian Concerto

BWV 909
  (1986). Ricercar RIC 038014
 Christiane Wuyts (1988). Brilliant Classics 99362/9.

BWV 1061a
Resonus RES 10189.

Further reading
 Introduction (in German and English) • Commentary (English translation—commentary in paperback original is in German)

]

 Sarah Elizabeth Hanks. The German Unaccompanied Keyboard Concerto in the Early 18th Century: Including Works of Walther, Bach, and Their Contemporaries. University of Iowa, 1972 (dissertation).

 Karl Heller. "Zur Stellung des Concerto C-Dur für zwei Cembali BWV 1061 in Bachs Konzert-Œuvre", pp. 241–251 in Bericht über die Wissenschaftliche Konferenz zum V. Internationalen Bachfest der DDR in Verbindung mit dem 60. Bachfest der Neuen Bach-Gesellschaft (1985), edited by Winfried Hoffmann and Armin Schneiderheinze. Leipzig, 1988. 

 

 (a reprint of a 1985 publication in Early Music)

Manuscripts
 25448 MSM at Conservatoire royal de Bruxelles: Fascicles 3 (BWV 972a) and 4 (BWV 981) at Bach Digital
 D-LEb Peters Ms. 8 at /Bach Archive: Fascicles 14 (BWV 971), 28 (BWV 984) and 29 (BWV 981) at Bach Digital
 D-LEm Poel. mus. Ms. 29 at Bach Digital)
 Mus.ms. Bach P 280 at Berlin State Library (BWV 592 and 973–982; ; D-B Mus. ms. Bach P 280 at Bach Digital)
 Mus.ms. Bach P 801 (28) at Berlin State Library ("Concerto di Marcello", BWV 981; ; D-B Mus. ms. Bach P 801, Fascicle 28 at Bach Digital)
 Mus.ms. Bach P 804 at Berlin State Library: Fascicles 4 (BWV 974), 15 (BWV 976), 28 (BWV 985), 34 (BWV 987), 35 (BWV 983), 46 (BWV 986), 52 (BWV 984), 54 (BWV 973), 55 (BWV 972) and 56 (BWV 977) at Bach Digital
 Mus.ms. Bach St 139, Fascicle 1 at Berlin State Library (autograph parts of BWV 1061a; D-B Mus. ms. Bach St 139, Faszikel 1 at Bach Digital)

References

Sources
 Kirsten Beißwenger. "An early version of the first movement of the Italian Concerto BWV 971 from the Scholz collection?" pp. 1–19 in Bach Studies 2 edited by Daniel R. Melamed. Cambridge University Press, 2006. 
 
 
 
 
 , Updates (2016)

External links
 At IMSLP website:
BWV 592a: Violin Concerto in G major (Johann Ernst Prinz von Sachsen-Weimar)
Italienisches Konzert, BWV 971 (Bach, Johann Sebastian)
16 Konzerte nach verschiedenen Meistern, BWV 972–987 (Bach, Johann Sebastian), Violin Concerto in D major, RV 230 (Vivaldi, Antonio), Violin Concerto in G major, RV 299 (Vivaldi, Antonio), Oboe Concerto in D minor, S.Z799 (Marcello, Alessandro), Violin Concerto in G minor, RV 316a (Vivaldi, Antonio), Violin Concerto in E major, RV 265 (Vivaldi, Antonio), Violin Concerto in G major, RV 310 (Vivaldi, Antonio), Violin Concerto in B-flat major, RV 383a (Vivaldi, Antonio), Violin Concerto in C major (Johann Ernst Prinz von Sachsen-Weimar) and Violin Concerto, TWV 51:g1 (Telemann, Georg Philipp)
12 Concerti Grossi, Op.1 (Marcello, Benedetto), L'estro armonico, Op.3 (Vivaldi, Antonio), La stravaganza, Op.4 (Vivaldi, Antonio), 12 Concerti, Op.7 (Vivaldi, Antonio) and 12 Concerti a 5 (Various)
 Concerto for 2 Harpsichords in C major, BWV 1061 (Bach, Johann Sebastian)

Concertos by Johann Sebastian Bach